The 1997–98 Gonzaga Bulldogs men's basketball team represented Gonzaga University in the West Coast Conference (WCC) during the 1997–98 NCAA Division I men's basketball season. Led by newly-promoted head coach Dan Monson, the Bulldogs were  overall in the regular season  and played their home games on campus at the Charlotte Y. Martin Centre in Spokane, Washington.

Regular season conference champions, Gonzaga lost to San Francisco in the WCC tournament final at Santa Clara. In the National Invitation Tournament (NIT), they advanced to the second round, and finished at 

Conference honors went to Monson as coach of the year, the first rookie head coach to win a WCC regular season title, and senior forward Bakari Hendrix was the player of the year. He repeated as the league's top scorer and was player of the month for three consecutive months. Sophomore point guard Matt Santangelo joined him as a unanimous selection to the all-conference team.

Monson was in his tenth season as a coach at Gonzaga; the previous nine were as an assistant under Dan Fitzgerald.

Roster

Schedule

Postseason results

|-
!colspan=6 style=| WCC tournament

|-
!colspan=6 style=| National Invitation tournament

References

External links
Sports Reference – Gonzaga Bulldogs men's basketball – 1997–98 season

Gonzaga Bulldogs men's basketball seasons
Gonzaga
Gonzaga
1997 in sports in Washington (state)
1998 in sports in Washington (state)